Michael Russell Woods (born 12 October 1986) is a Canadian racing cyclist, who rides for UCI WorldTeam  and is the first person to break four minutes in the mile and complete the Tour de France.

Career

Athletics career
Woods' first sport was ice hockey and his childhood ambition was to play as a left wing for the Toronto Maple Leafs. Prior to becoming a cyclist, Woods was a promising middle-distance runner, setting Canadian national junior records in the mile and 3000 metres in 2005, as well as taking the gold medal in the 1500 metres at the 2005 Pan American Junior Athletics Championships. However, he suffered a recurring stress fracture in his left foot, exacerbated by excessive training and racing, resulting in his running his last race in 2007. Woods underwent surgery twice in order to correct the problem without success. He took up cycling initially as cross-training before friends persuaded him to enter races.

Woods was taught English at school by Paul Dewar, who was later elected as a Member of Parliament. Woods attended the University of Michigan on a track athletic scholarship, graduating in 2008. Whilst at Michigan, he was coached by Ron Warhurst.

Cycling career

On 20 August 2015 it was announced that Woods would join  for the 2016 cycling season.

In 2016, Woods was officially named in Canada's 2016 Olympic team. Woods was also named in the start list for the 2017 Giro d'Italia. He finished the 2017 Giro, his first grand tour, in 38th place, taking two fifth-place stage finishes along the way and helping teammate Pierre Rolland to win a stage. Woods was later named in the start list for the 2017 Vuelta a España where he finished his second Grand Tour in 7th place, taking one third-place finish and five top-tens.

In 2018, Woods scored what he described as "the best result of my career" by finishing second in the Liège–Bastogne–Liège race. In September 2018, Woods won Stage 17 of the Vuelta a España, which finished up a steep climb to Balcón de Bizkaia. On 30 September, Woods finished third in the road race at the UCI Road World Championships in Innsbruck, Austria. It was the first medal for Canada at the World Championships since Svein Tuft's silver medal in the time trial in 2008, and their first medal in the road race since Steve Bauer's bronze-medal performance in 1984.

In July 2019, he was named in the startlist for the 2019 Tour de France. In October 2019 he won the oldest classic race, the 100th edition of Milano–Torino. In August 2020, it was announced that Woods was to join  from the 2021 season, on a three-year contract. He represented Canada at the 2020 Summer Olympics and finished in fifth place in the men's individual road race.

Major results

2013
 9th Overall Tour de Beauce
2014
 4th Road race, National Road Championships
 6th Overall Tour de Beauce
2015
 1st Clássica Loulé
 2nd Overall Tour of Utah
1st Stage 5
 2nd Philadelphia International Cycling Classic
 4th Overall Tour of the Gila
1st Stage 5
 10th Overall Tour of Alberta
1st  Canadian rider classification
2016
 2nd Milano–Torino
 5th Overall Tour Down Under
2017
 2nd GP Miguel Induráin
 7th Overall Vuelta a España
 9th Liège–Bastogne–Liège
2018
 1st Stage 17 Vuelta a España
 2nd Liège–Bastogne–Liège
 3rd  Road race, UCI Road World Championships
 4th Giro dell'Emilia
 4th Tre Valli Varesine
 9th Overall Tour of Utah
2019
 1st Milano–Torino
 2nd Giro dell'Emilia
 2nd Japan Cup
 3rd Overall Herald Sun Tour
1st Stage 2
 5th Giro di Lombardia
 5th Liège–Bastogne–Liège
 6th Overall Volta a Catalunya
 7th Overall Tour Down Under
 8th Grand Prix Cycliste de Montréal
 9th Clásica de San Sebastián
 10th Overall Tour de Romandie
2020
 1st Stage 7 Vuelta a España
 3rd La Flèche Wallonne
 7th Liège–Bastogne–Liège
 8th Overall Tirreno–Adriatico
1st Stage 3
2021
 2nd Overall Tour des Alpes-Maritimes et du Var
1st Stage 2
 3rd Giro dell'Emilia
 4th La Flèche Wallonne
 5th Road race, Olympic Games
 5th Overall Tour de Romandie
1st Stage 4
 5th Overall Tour de Suisse
1st  Mountains classification
 5th Overall Tour of Britain
 5th Liège–Bastogne–Liège
 5th Milano–Torino
 9th Giro di Lombardia
 Tour de France
Held  after Stage 14
2022
 1st  Overall Route d'Occitanie
1st Stage 3
 2nd Overall O Gran Camiño
1st Stage 2
 2nd Mercan'Tour Classic
 6th La Flèche Wallonne
 10th Liège–Bastogne–Liège

General classification results timeline

Classics results timeline

References

External links

 

1986 births
Living people
Canadian male cyclists
Canadian Vuelta a España stage winners
Cyclists at the 2016 Summer Olympics
Cyclists at the 2020 Summer Olympics
People from East York, Toronto
Sportspeople from Toronto
Sportspeople from Ottawa
University of Michigan alumni
Olympic cyclists of Canada
Hillcrest High School (Ottawa) alumni
20th-century Canadian people
21st-century Canadian people
Cyclists from Ontario